PC Rohlupuia (born 16 January 1999) is an Indian professional footballer who played as a midfielder for the Indian Super League club Mumbai City.

Career
Rohlupuia started his career with the youth academy of East Bengal FC and played for the East Bengal F.C. U-18 side. The Academy coach, Ranjan Chowdhury, scouted Rohlupuia from Mizoram and brought him to East Bengal, where he developed as a ball-playing central midfielder. He reached the semi-finals of the 2017-18 U-18 I-League, where he impressed throughout the campaign and scored 2 goals, but the team lost to Shillong Lajong FC in the semi-finals by 2-0.

East Bengal FC

2018–19
In 2018-19, under coach Alejandro Menendez, Rohlupuia was promoted to the senior side and was part of the team which toured Malaysia for the pre-season and played 4 friendlies as a part of the preparation for the 2018-19 I-League. He joined the team as a central midfielder but spent most of the season on the reserve bench and played only in one game as he made his senior debut when he came on from the bench against Minerva Punjab F.C. away at Tau Devi Lal Stadium, Chandigarh, on 3 March 2019, which East Bengal FC won 1-0. Rohlupuia played just 8 minutes in the game.

2019–20
At the start of 2019-20 season, Rohlupuia signed a three-years contract extension with East Bengal, along with Manoj Mohammed and Prakash Sarkar, keeping him at the club until 2022. 

He was started in the very first game of the Centenary Season as a central midfielder beside Lalrindika Ralte, against Army Red in the 2019 Durand Cup which East Bengal won 2-0 with goals from Jaime Santos Colado and Bidyashagar Singh.

Career statistics

Club

Honours

Club
East Bengal:
I-League: runner-up: 2018-19
Mumbai City:
Indian Super League (Premiership): 2022–23

References

External links

1999 births
Living people
Footballers from Mizoram
Indian footballers
I-League players
East Bengal Club players
Association football midfielders
Indian Super League players
Mumbai City FC players